The 1942 Minnesota gubernatorial election took place on November 3, 1942. Republican Party of Minnesota candidate Harold Stassen defeated Farmer–Labor Party challenger Hjalmar Petersen.  This was the last election in which the Democratic Party of Minnesota and the Farmer–Labor Party ran separate candidates; in 1944, both parties ran under the umbrella of the Minnesota Democratic–Farmer–Labor Party. Martin A. Nelson and John G. Alexander unsuccessfully ran for the Republican nomination.

Results

See also
 List of Minnesota gubernatorial elections

External links
 http://www.sos.state.mn.us/home/index.asp?page=653
 http://www.sos.state.mn.us/home/index.asp?page=657

Gubernatorial
1942
Minnesota
November 1942 events